Brigitte Pelletier (born 1964) is a Canadian lawyer in Quebec and former associate deputy minister of the Quebec Ministry of Justice. She is a graduate of Université Laval.

She was a former chief of staff for Quebec premier Bernard Landry in 2002-2003.

Following Landry's defeat in 2003, she was appointed as Associate Deputy Deputy Minister of Justice.

References
Quebec Government. Office of the Premier. Biography of Brigitte Pelletier.

Quebec civil servants
Lawyers in Quebec
Living people
1964 births
Université Laval alumni
Canadian women lawyers